Concrete Blonde is the debut album of American alternative rock band Concrete Blonde.

"Still in Hollywood", "Your Haunted Head" and "Over Your Shoulder" were featured on The Hidden soundtrack. "Your Haunted Head" and "Over Your Shoulder" appeared also on The Texas Chainsaw Massacre 2 soundtrack. In 1997, Canadian punk band Propagandhi covered "True" for the Fat Wreck Chords compilation album Physical Fatness, as well Propagandhi's rarities compilation Where Quantity Is Job #1.

The album was remastered and re-released in 2004 by Superfecta Recordings.

Track listing
All songs written by Johnette Napolitano, except where noted.

Charts

References

Concrete Blonde albums
1986 debut albums
I.R.S. Records albums
Albums produced by Earle Mankey